Air Cut is the fourth studio album by Curved Air and was recorded in 1973, following the departure of three of the band's founding members. Only Sonja Kristina and Mike Wedgwood remained in the band from their previous album and Air Cut took them in a more rock-oriented direction.

Reception

While offering high praise for the track "Metamorphosis", AllMusic's reaction to the album was otherwise lukewarm, stating that most of the songs were straightforward rock numbers and "pictured a group trying to widen its audience without sounding convinced it was the right thing to do."  It concluded that Air Cut's main point of interest is the debut of Eddie Jobson.

Track listing

Side one

Side two

Personnel
Curved Air
 Sonja Kristina – lead (1-4, 6, 8) and backing (7) vocals, acoustic guitar (2)
 Eddie Jobson – electric violin, backing vocals (6), VCS3 synthesizer, mellotron, pianos, organ, harpsichord (2) 
 Kirby Gregory – guitars, bass guitar (4), backing vocals
 Mike Wedgwood – bass guitar (all but 4), acoustic guitar (4), backing and lead (7, 8) vocals
 Jim Russell – drums
Additional credits
 Artwork design by Modula
 Artwork illustration based on drawing by Ian Fink
 Engineer – Paul "The Rock" Hardiman
 Photography – Mal Linwood-Ross & Mike Putland

References

Curved Air albums
1973 albums
Albums produced by Martin Rushent
Warner Records albums